"Rhodopis" is an ancient tale about a Greek slave girl who marries the king of Egypt. The story was first recorded by the Greek historian Strabo in the late first century BC or early first century AD and is considered the earliest known variant of the "Cinderella" story. The origins of the fairy-tale figure may be traced back to the 6th-century BC hetaera Rhodopis.

Plot
The story is first recorded by the Greek geographer Strabo (64 or 63 BC –  24 AD) in his Geographica (book 17, 33), written sometime between c. 7 BC and c. 24 AD:

Sources 
The Greek geographer Strabo (died c. 24 AD) first recorded the tale of the Greek girl Rhodopis in his Geographica. This passage is considered to be the earliest variant of the Cinderella story. The same story is also later reported by the Roman orator Aelian (ca. 175–ca. 235) in his Miscellaneous History, which was written entirely in Greek. Aelian's story closely resembles the story told by Strabo, but adds that the name of the pharaoh in question was Psammetichus. Aelian's account indicates that the story of Rhodopis remained popular throughout antiquity.

Herodotus, some five centuries before Strabo, records a popular legend about a possibly-related courtesan named Rhodopis in his Histories, claiming that Rhodopis came from Thrace, and was the slave of Iadmon (Ἰάδμων) of Samos, and a fellow-slave of the story-teller Aesop and that she was taken to Egypt in the time of Pharaoh Amasis (570–536 BC), and freed there for a large sum by Charaxus (Χάραξος) of Mytilene, brother of Sappho the lyric poet.

See also 
Rhodopis (hetaera)
Cinderella

References

External links
 The Ancient Greek Cinderella
 The Egyptian Cinderella Debunked

Female characters in fairy tales
Greek fairy tales
Egyptian fairy tales
ATU 500-559